Schoenobiinae is a subfamily of the lepidopteran family Crambidae. The subfamily was described by Philogène Auguste Joseph Duponchel in 1846.

Genera
Adelpherupa Hampson, 1919 (= Limnopsares Meyrick, 1934, Schoenoploca Meyrick, 1933)
Alloperissa Meyrick, 1934
Archischoenobius Speidel, 1984
Argyrostola Hampson, 1896
Brihaspa Moore, 1868
Calamoschoena Poulton, 1916 (= Eurycerota Janse, 1917)
Carectocultus A. Blanchard, 1975
Catagela Walker, 1863
Chionobosca Turner, 1911
Cyclocausta Warren, 1889
Dejoannisia Vári, 2002 (= Schoenobiodes de Joannis, 1927)
Donacaula Meyrick, 1890
Helonastes Common, 1960
Leechia South in Leech & South, 1901
Leptosteges Warren, 1889
Leucargyra Hampson, 1896
Leucoides Hampson, 1893
Niphadoses Common, 1960
Panalipa Moore, 1866 (= Microschoenis Meyrick, 1887)
Patissa Moore, 1886 (= Eurycraspeda Warren in Swinhoe, 1890)
Promacrochilo Błeszyński, 1962 (= Macrochilo Hampson, 1896)
Proschoenobius Munroe, 1974
Ramila Moore, 1868 (= Crambostenia Warren in Swinhoe, 1890, Ramilla West, 1931)
Rupela Walker, 1863 (= Storteria Barnes & McDunnough, 1913)
Schoenobius Duponchel, 1836 (= Erioproctus Zeller, 1839)
Scirpophaga Treitschke, 1832 (= Apurima Walker, 1863, Schoenophaga Duponchel, 1836, Schoinophaga Sodoffsky, 1837, Schoenophaga J. L. R. Agassiz, 1847, Spartophaga Duponchel, 1836, Tryporyza Common, 1960)
Stenocalama Hampson, 1919
Tipanaea Walker, 1863

Former genera
Varpa Aurivillius, 1925

References

 , 2012: A molecular phylogeny for the pyraloid moths (Lepidoptera: Pyraloidea) and its implications for higher-level classification. Systematic Entomology 37 (4): 635–656. Abstract: .
 , 2000: Dichromatism and New Synonymies of Carectocultus perstrialis (Lepidoptera: Crambidae: Schoenobiinae). Tropical Lepidoptera Research 11 (1-2): 40–41.

 
Crambidae
Moth subfamilies
Taxa named by Philogène Auguste Joseph Duponchel